Paradiso is a live DVD released by the rock band Fiction Plane on 23 March 2009 through XIII Bis Records.

Recording and production
The video was recorded on 7 December 2008 at the band's sold-out performance in Amsterdam at the Paradiso concert venue.

Paradiso was mixed by Ash Howes (Kylie Minogue, James Morrison, Eurythmics) and mastered by Andy Walters (U2, The Cure, Radiohead) at Abbey Road Studios. 
The cover art was contributed by Alex Lake, who, in addition to supplying the artwork for Fiction Plane's two previous releases Bitter Forces and Lame Race Horses (2005) and Left Side of the Brain (2007), has also worked with Keane, Rufus Wainwright, and Amy Winehouse.

Release
Paradiso was released in two formats: a DVD, and a DVD with a two-CD album. A Blu-ray disc was also planned but never released due to a production error.

Special features on the DVD include the unedited version of the "It's a Lie" video, directed by Jake Sumner, who is the half-brother of Fiction Plane's Joe Sumner and the son of Sting, and a photo gallery of images taken during the band's tour.

The limited edition disc was sold only in France, the Netherlands and Belgium.

Track list 

Fiction Plane albums
2009 video albums